Ahmed Shiaan is the additional Secretary and Deputy Minister of Ministry of Foreign Affairs of Maldives. He was appointed when the new government cabinet took office in 26 March 2018.

Shiaan served as the Maldives Ambassador the European Union (EU) and Netherlands, United Kingdom (UK), before his appointment to Ministry of Foreign Affairs of Maldives. He also has 4 children. Nuh Alaniya Imani and Zunnoon.

References

Maldivian politicians
Ambassadors of the Maldives to the European Union
High Commissioners of the Maldives to the United Kingdom
Living people
Year of birth missing (living people)